Girotti is an Italian surname. Notable people with the surname include:

Camillo Girotti (born 1918), Italian footballer
Gianfranco Girotti (born 1937), Italian titular bishop
Giuseppe Girotti (1905–1945), Italian anti-fascist
Ken Girotti, Canadian television director
Mario Girotti (born 1939), birth name of Italian actor Terence Hill
Massimo Girotti (1918–2003), Italian actor

Italian-language surnames